The following are supporting characters in the Harry Potter series written by J. K. Rowling. For members of the Order of the Phoenix, Dumbledore's Army, Hogwarts staff, Ministry of Magic, or for Death Eaters, see the respective articles.

The Dursleys
The Dursley family are Harry Potter's last living relatives. To ensure Harry's safety, Albus Dumbledore placed him in the Dursleys' care when he was a baby. The Dursleys live at Number 4, Privet Drive, Little Whinging in Surrey, England. They are all Muggles, and despise all things related to magic – and anything out of the ordinary in general – and the Wizarding World, especially the Potters.

Vernon Dursley
Vernon Dursley is Harry's uncle, married to his aunt Petunia. Vernon is described as a big, beefy man, looking somewhat like a walrus, with hardly any neck, and a large moustache. He is very much the head of his family, laying down most of the rules for Harry and doing most of the threatening, as well as spoiling Dudley. He is also the director of a drill-making firm, Grunnings, and seems to be quite successful in his career. He regularly reads the Daily Mail.

Uncle Vernon and his wife have grudgingly raised Harry from an early age. He and Petunia were often hostile to Harry and never informed him about the magical world, including how his parents died; instead explaining it away as a car crash. Vernon detests Harry to the degree of locking him up as a form of punishment.  During the summer of Harry's second year of Hogwarts, Vernon puts bars on Harry's window to keep him at 4 Privet Drive. His plan is soon thwarted by the Weasleys, who rescue Harry in their father's flying car. Vernon also has an aversion to imagination, to any references to magic, and anything out of the ordinary.

When the Dursleys decide to leave Privet Drive to go into hiding, Vernon nearly shakes Harry's hand good-bye, though he ultimately does not bring himself to do it. In the film adaptation, he leaves without even a word to Harry although a deleted scene showing Dudley and Harry's reconciliation shows him saying "This is farewell".

Vernon is portrayed by Richard Griffiths in the films.

Petunia Dursley
Petunia Dursley  is Harry's maternal aunt, Lily Potter's older sister, Vernon's wife, Dudley's mother, and Marge's sister-in-law. She is described as a bony woman with blonde hair (though dark-haired in the films) that she passed down to her son, a "rather horsey" face and a very long neck, and spends most of her time spying on her neighbours. Her eyes are large and pale, quite unlike Lily's. Her entire family, except Lily, is made up of Muggles. According to Petunia, her parents were proud of having a witch in the family, but Petunia saw her sister as a freak. In fact, Petunia was envious and resentful of Lily's magical abilities and went so far as to write to Dumbledore, pleading to be allowed to enter Hogwarts. Dumbledore gently denied her enrolment. Afterwards, Petunia grew bitter towards the school and, by extension, towards the wizarding world in general.

Petunia has more knowledge of the wizarding world than she is initially willing to admit. After the Dementors attack Harry and Dudley, Petunia states that she knows Dementors guard the wizard prison, Azkaban. When Harry and the rest of her family look at her strangely, she explains that she heard "that awful boy" telling Lily about them years ago. Harry assumes that the "awful boy" was his father, James, but in Harry Potter and the Deathly Hallows, he learns via flashback memories that it was actually Severus Snape, who knew both Lily and Petunia when they were children. On one occasion, Petunia almost throws Harry out of their house, but when she receives a Howler from Albus Dumbledore, she decides not to send the boy away due to the agreement she had made with Dumbledore. It is later revealed that she wished to be a witch as a child.

Before the Dursleys leave Privet Drive to go into hiding, Petunia almost wishes Harry good luck, suggesting that she does feel a tiny sense of familial attachment to her nephew; however her self-imposed dislike of magic prevents her from doing so, and she leaves without a word. In the film version of Harry Potter and the Deathly Hallows – Part 1, she leaves Harry without showing any sentiment; however, in a deleted scene on the Blu-ray/DVD release, Petunia shows acknowledgment of the wizarding world, and ultimately deep sadness and remorse for the loss of her younger sister Lily, reminding Harry that she lost a sister as well. 
In Harry Potter and the Cursed Child, Petunia Dursley is mentioned as having died a few years after Harry's second son Albus Severus started studying at Hogwarts.

Actress Fiona Shaw portrays Petunia in the films, with Ariella Paradise playing her as a child.

Dudley Dursley
Dudley Dursley is Vernon and Petunia Dursley's only son and Harry's first cousin. Described as a very large, blond hippopotamus (though brown haired in the films), Dudley is given his way in almost everything, and shows the symptoms of a spoiled brat. Dudley is a cold-hearted worm and the leader of a gang of thugs with whom he regularly beats up Harry and younger children on the flimsiest of excuses. For this purpose, he is described early in the first novel as the reason for Harry being friendless before enrolling at Hogwarts: though Harry was good at sports and got good grades, he was the favorite victim of Dudley's bullying, rendering classmates too scared to admit to liking him. He is only one month older than Harry, meaning that his birthday must be sometime in late June. The same year Harry starts at Hogwarts, Dudley is enrolled at his father's old private boarding school, Smeltings.

In Harry Potter and the Philosopher's Stone, Dudley is given a pig's tail by Rubeus Hagrid which has to be removed at a private hospital in London. In Goblet of Fire, the Smeltings school nurse advises the Dursleys to put him on a strict diet. During the summer when this diet is enforced, the Weasleys arrive at Number 4, Privet Drive to pick Harry up for the Quidditch World Cup, and Fred Weasley "accidentally" drops a Ton-Tongue Toffee, which enlarges Dudley's tongue to four feet long before his hysterical mother reluctantly allows Arthur Weasley to shrink it. By the start of Order of the Phoenix, Dudley has been on his diet for a year, taken up boxing, and become a regional inter-school champion.

In the fifth book, two Dementors attack Dudley and Harry in an alley. Dudley collapses, and Harry uses the Patronus to drive a group of Dementors away from himself and his cousin. Mrs. Figg, their neighbour, then comes running in and reveals she is a Squib by talking about Dementors. Harry and Mrs. Figg carry the shaken Dudley home, though Dudley is convinced that Harry made the Dementors appear in the first place. After the confrontation, Harry wonders what sort of bad memories Dudley could have relived, as Dementors force people to relive their worst experiences. Rowling later revealed, in an on-line chat, that Dudley's worst fear was seeing himself for who he really was: a cruel, selfish, violent bully with no feelings whatsoever for others, and this revelation shocked him to the core. The experience gives Dudley a more favourable impression of Harry, as seen in Deathly Hallows, when Dudley is the only member of the family to accept Harry: he shakes his hand and thanks him for saving his soul from the Dementor attack, and shows some concern for him when the Dursleys leave to go into hiding. In his appreciation of his cousin's belated gratitude, Harry says good-bye to him using Dudley's former nickname, "Big D". In the film version, however, there is no such sentiment as Dudley leaves Harry before he can say any final words; however, on the Blu-ray/DVD release, a deleted scene includes the reconciliation between the two cousins.

Rowling revealed on her website that many people have asked her to include an adult Dudley with a wizarding child in the epilogue of Deathly Hallows, and that she herself considered it, but decided upon reflection that any "latent wizarding genes would never survive contact with Uncle Vernon's DNA" and thus she did not do so. Rowling says that Harry and Dudley would "stay on Christmas card" terms for the rest of their lives, and that Harry would take his family to visit Dudley's when they were in the neighbourhood, but it was something that James Sirius, Albus Severus and Lily Luna "would dread". However, Dudley's kids and Harry's occasionally would "get together while the adults sat in awkward silence". In Harry Potter and the Cursed Child it is also mentioned that adult Dudley sent Harry his baby blanket, one of the two surviving possession of Harry's from his parents.

Dudley is portrayed by Harry Melling in the Harry Potter films. Melling had to wear a fat suit, as he lost a considerable amount of weight as the films progressed.

Marge Dursley
Marjorie Eileen Dursley is Vernon's older sister and resembles him: a large woman with hardly any neck and even a bit of a moustache, though not as bushy as Vernon's. She lives in the country, where she breeds bulldogs, and her commitment to them prevents her from visiting Privet Drive more often, to Harry's considerable relief. Though she and Harry are not related by blood, the Dursleys force him to call her "Aunt Marge". Vernon and Petunia's lies lead her to believe Harry is a horrible boy. Unpleasant and reprehensible, she treats Harry with contempt and cruelty, though she adores Dudley, and delights in insulting both him and his dead parents. In Harry Potter and the Prisoner of Azkaban after she insults Harry's parents, Harry loses his temper and inflates her, thus causing her to blow up like a balloon and float to the ceiling. The Ministry of Magic later rescues Marge, changes her back, and erases her memory of the incident. She also appears in a memory in Harry Potter and the Order of the Phoenix when one of Marge's bulldogs chases Harry up a tree.

Pam Ferris played Marge in the film adaptation of Harry Potter and the Prisoner of Azkaban, in which she floats out of the house and into the sky after being inflated.

Others

Bathilda Bagshot
Bathilda Bagshot is a noted historian in the wizarding world, and author of the book A History of Magic. She lives in the village where Harry was born, Godric's Hollow, and is an old family friend of Dumbledore, as well as being the Potters' neighbour and friend. Gellert Grindelwald is her great-nephew, which is why he comes to live in Godric's Hollow after being expelled from Durmstrang. Bathilda is a major source of information for Rita Skeeter's biography of Dumbledore, who extracts this information under the influence of Veritaserum; it is possible her memory is also modified following the "interview." Harry decides to go to Godric's Hollow to get information from Bathilda, and because he wants to see his parents' grave. Hermione thinks that Dumbledore might have entrusted her with Gryffindor's Sword. Bathilda dies before Harry's arrival in Godric's Hollow,  at the hand of Lord Voldemort, who enchants her decaying body to use as an outer skin for his snake, Nagini to wait for Harry. The snake is then instructed to subdue Harry when he arrives in Bathilda's house looking for the sword until Voldemort himself can get there to finish him off.

Hazel Douglas plays Bathilda in Harry Potter and the Deathly Hallows – Part 1.

Frank Bryce
Frank Bryce is a reclusive Muggle World War II veteran who works as the caretaker of the Riddle family mansion in Little Hangleton. In 1943, the Riddles were murdered by Tom Riddle (later to become Lord Voldemort), and since Bryce had the keys to the large house where the deaths occurred, he was arrested and questioned in connection with the murders. As there was lack of evidence (because the bodies were unmarked as the Killing Curse leaves no sign of violence or damage on the victims) the police could not prove that the Riddles had been murdered, and were forced to release Bryce. However, the community of Little Hangleton was distrustful of Bryce. As a result, he lived out the rest of his life by himself, living on the grounds of the Riddles' estate, while still tending to the grounds.

In the beginning of Harry Potter and the Goblet of Fire, Voldemort discreetly returns to the Riddle house. Bryce inadvertently overhears Voldemort's plan to kill Harry, initially thinking that Voldemort and Wormtail are spies, but before he can take action, Nagini reveals his presence to Voldemort, who kills him with the Killing curse. He appears once more in the same book, during Harry and Voldemort's graveyard duel. The Priori Incantatem effect brings back an "echo" of Bryce from the tip of Voldemort's wand. Despite not knowing who he is, Bryce enthusiastically encourages Harry to keep fighting.

Dumbledore states his belief in Harry Potter and the Half-Blood Prince that the murder of Bryce was used to create Voldemort's presumably sixth and intended final Horcrux, implanted in Nagini. However, Rowling later said Voldemort used the earlier murder of Bertha Jorkins for this.

Bryce is portrayed by Eric Sykes in the film adaptation of Harry Potter and the Goblet of Fire.

Crabbe and Goyle
Vincent Crabbe and Gregory Goyle are Slytherin students in Harry's year; both of their fathers, Crabbe Sr and Goyle Sr, are Death Eaters. Due to their size and strength, the pair act as Draco Malfoy's minions and serve "to do Malfoy's bidding", especially to intimidate fellow students. Both are entirely lacking in introspection or curiosity, though Crabbe is shown to be significantly smarter than Goyle. They seem unable to make up their own minds or to see things their own way. Crabbe and Goyle serve a somewhat more significant role in Harry Potter and the Chamber of Secrets, where they are impersonated by Ron and Harry respectively using Polyjuice Potion in order to learn about the Chamber of Secrets from Malfoy.

Crabbe and Goyle make their first appearance as new Slytherin Quidditch Beaters in the opening match against Gryffindor in their fifth year; after Harry catches the Snitch, Crabbe vents his frustration by purposely hitting a Bludger into Harry's back and knocking him off his broom, for which he receives the light punishment of writing lines. They do not return to the team the following year, as they regularly serve as Malfoy's lookouts during his forays into the Room of Requirement. After Malfoy leaves the school following the death of Dumbledore just before the end of the term, Crabbe and Goyle are left in a state of loneliness.

The three of them are reunited in Harry Potter and the Deathly Hallows. Both of them speak for the first time, Crabbe's voice being described as "oddly soft for someone with his huge frame" and Goyle's simply as a grunt. Crabbe has sided with the Death Eaters with more conviction than either Goyle or Malfoy, and becomes increasingly independent of Malfoy, well aware of the Malfoy family's falling out of favour with Voldemort. The pair have developed into surprisingly powerful wizards. Crabbe and Goyle are mentioned as having excelled in inflicting the Cruciatus Curse  on other pupils who had received detentions under Amycus Carrow's direction: according to Neville Longbottom, it was "the first time they were the best in anything". During the fight for the Horcrux diadem with Harry, Ron Weasley and Hermione Granger in the Room of Requirement, Crabbe defies Malfoy's order to not kill Harry and casually throws around the Avada Kedavra curse.  Finally, he summons magical fire and turns the room into a blazing inferno, but it quickly rages beyond his control and leads to his death and the destruction of the Horcrux. Goyle is knocked unconscious during the ensuing fight, but is rescued, along with Draco, by Harry, Ron and Hermione.

Jamie Waylett portrayed Crabbe and Joshua Herdman played Goyle in the first six films of the Harry Potter film series; due to Waylett's legal troubles, only Herdman appears in Harry Potter and the Deathly Hallows – Part 1 and Harry Potter and the Deathly Hallows – Part 2, with Crabbe's role in the plot being replaced by Goyle, and Goyle being replaced by Blaise Zabini.

Gellert Grindelwald
Gellert Grindelwald is a dark wizard who, on a list of "Most Dangerous Dark Wizards of All Time," would be second only to Voldemort, according to Rita Skeeter's book The Life and Lies of Albus Dumbledore. His name is first mentioned in Philosopher's Stone on a Chocolate Frog card which notes that Dumbledore defeated Grindelwald in 1945. The character is not mentioned again until Deathly Hallows where he plays a significant part of the subplot about Dumbledore's backstory.

Grindelwald attended the wizarding school Durmstrang, from which he was expelled at age sixteen for his dangerous and evil experiments that nearly resulted in the deaths of some of his fellow students. He left the symbol of the Deathly Hallows on one of the walls in Durmstrang before departing. After Durmstrang, he went to live with his great-aunt Bathilda Bagshot in Godric's Hollow in England, where he met the young Dumbledore who had been recently orphaned and left to put his plans to travel the world on hold to care for his younger siblings. In Deathly Hallows, it was revealed that Grindelwald had gone to Godric's Hollow to investigate the grave of the Peverell brothers (the original owners of the Hallows), but struck up a romantic relationship with Dumbledore. The two planned to establish a new world order, where wizards would rule over Muggles "for the greater good".  The phrase later became Grindelwald's excuse for the atrocities he committed in his reign of terror. They also planned to work together in their quest for the Hallows. Later Rowling claimed at a Q&A session that she implied Dumbledore being once in love with Grindelwald, and thus he had 'lost his moral compass,' but she did not say whether those feelings were returned. Although it was later clarified in the Fantastic Beasts film series, that Grindelwald did reciprocate these feelings which is verbally confirmed when he shouts, "Who will love you now, Dumbledore? You're all alone!" at him. 

However, Aberforth Dumbledore, Albus's younger brother, argued against these plans, because he feared their grand ambitions would leave his and Albus's disabled, traumatised sister, Ariana, abandoned. Later the argument culminated in a three-way duel among Albus, Aberforth, and Grindelwald. Ariana was inadvertently killed by one of them. Grindelwald fled, fearing retribution and their relationship ended then and there. Grindelwald became master of one of the Deathly Hallows, the Elder Wand, by stealing it from the previous owner, the wand-maker Gregorovitch. Gaining the Elder Wand's immense power, he subsequently committed many terrible acts, terrorising Europe while avoiding Britain. It is revealed that Grindelwald's actions have caused many deaths that have greatly affected the students of Durmstrang, including Viktor Krum, whose grandfather was murdered by Grindelwald.

After Grindelwald's rise to power, Dumbledore delayed meeting him again for several years due to his fear of being confronted with his sister's death and the fact that he himself might have been the one who accidentally killed her. Both wizards were highly intelligent and skilled in battle, and when their battle eventually occurred, those who witnessed it later said that no other wizarding duel ever matched it. Grindelwald, who at the time possessed the supposedly unbeatable Elder Wand, lost to Dumbledore. Since Dumbledore won the duel over Grindelwald, the Elder Wand transferred its allegiance to Dumbledore. After Dumbledore triumphed over Grindelwald, the defeated dark wizard was imprisoned in the top-most cell of Nurmengard. He remained there, growing emaciated and toothless through the ravages of the prison, until Deathly Hallows when Voldemort arrives, seeking the Elder Wand. Grindelwald, showing no fear of Voldemort and welcoming death, tells him that he never owned the wand, and an enraged Voldemort kills him. In the chapter "King's Cross", Harry suggests to Dumbledore that, by lying to Voldemort to prevent him from breaking into Dumbledore's tomb and taking the Elder Wand, Grindelwald may have been trying to atone for his crimes. In Harry Potter and the Deathly Hallows – Part 1, young Grindelwald is portrayed by Jamie Campbell Bower while the older Grindelwald is played by Michael Byrne. In the film, unlike in the book, Grindelwald reveals to Voldemort the whereabouts of the Elder Wand.

Grindelwald appears in the Fantastic Beasts film series, portrayed by Johnny Depp in the first two films. In the film series storyline, Grindelwald and Dumbledore have made a blood pact in their youth to never harm each other which Grindelwald sports in a vial while seeking a means to indirectly kill his former lover. He first appears in Fantastic Beasts and Where to Find Them, though he is disguised for most of the story as the American Auror , played by Colin Farrell, while seeking out an Obscurus whom he learned to be Credence Barebone. In Fantastic Beasts: The Crimes of Grindelwald, Grindelwald manages to manipulate both Credence and Queenie Goldstein to his side by promising the former he will tell him who he really is (supposedly Aurelius Dumbledore, a long lost brother to Albus and Aberforth) and the latter that she will be free to marry her No-Maj fiancé, Jacob Kowalski. Campbell Bower reprises his role as the teenaged version of the character in a brief flashback scene as well. In November 2020, Depp resigned from the role at the request of Warner Bros. due to his personal legal troubles. Later that month, it was reported that Mads Mikkelsen was in early talks to replace Depp as Grindelwald for the third film. On 25 November 2020, Warner Bros. officially announced that Mikkelsen would replace Depp. On replacing Depp, Mikkelsen noted that it would be a "creative suicide" to copy Depp's "masterful" portrayal as Grindelwald, having developed his own take on the character, and admitted that a "bridge" should be needed between Depp's performance and his own, having been a fan of Depp since his early films.

In Fantastic Beasts: The Secrets of Dumbledore, Grindelwald attempts to get elected as the Supreme Mugwump of the International Confederation of Wizards. He has the incumbent Supreme Mugwump (and German Minister of Magic) Anton Vogel pardon him of his crimes and get him on the ballot late. He then enchants a dead Qilin (which recognizes those with pure hearts) to bow to him to sway the crowd to electing him. He is successful at doing this until his ruse is exposed by Credence Barebone and Newt Scamander and the dead Qilin's living sister is produced. When the new vote is called, she first bows to Albus Dumbledore and then to Brazilian witch Vicencia Santos, who is elected the new Supreme Mugwump. He attempts to kill Credence but the blood pact is broken in the crossing of spells. The two of them fight to a draw before Dumbledore turns his back on him. A distraught Grindelwald apparates away, signifying that the war has begun for good.

Viktor Krum
Viktor Krum (Bulgarian: Виктор Крум) is the Seeker for the Bulgarian national Quidditch team. He is a prodigy—exceptionally well coordinated on a broom but slightly unbalanced on land. Though a successful Quidditch player, Krum is unhappy, and Hermione is one of the few who think of him as a nice person beneath the sullen exterior. In the Quidditch World Cup title game between Bulgaria and Ireland, he suffers a severe bloody nose during the match and catches the Snitch as quickly as he can to end it, which hands victory to Ireland because Bulgaria was trailing by 160 points at the time.

Krum is named Durmstrang champion upon entering his name for the prestigious Triwizard Tournament. He is often viewed with suspicion by his peers due to Durmstrang's reputation for teaching the Dark Arts, while looked upon with admiration for his feats, mainly by giggling Hogwarts girls. Whilst competing in the Triwizard Tournament, he takes to visiting the Hogwarts library to try to talk to Hermione. He eventually gains the courage to ask her to the Yule Ball, a traditional formal dance associated with the Triwizard Tournament. Krum has to rescue her from the merpeople in the Great Lake for the Second Task, revealing his deep affection for her. Immediately afterward, he invited her to stay with him in Bulgaria and stated that he had "never felt this way about a girl before." He becomes jealous of Harry when a slanderous news article by Rita Skeeter falsely states that Hermione is toying with both boys' affections, and confronts him about it. When he learns the truth, he and Harry become friendly, shortly before the appearance of a mentally incapacitated Bartemius Crouch Sr. Crouch's disguised son stuns Krum shortly afterward, to murder his father unnoticed. In the climax of the book, Krum, under the influence of an Imperius Curse cast by Barty Crouch Jr, uses the Cruciatus Curse on Cedric Diggory to eliminate any opposition for Harry to win the tournament, but is not arrested nor punished for this, as he was not in control of his own faculties.

Krum briefly returns in Deathly Hallows, as a wedding guest of Bill and Fleur. He has a heated discussion with Xenophilius Lovegood, after he recognises a symbol that Xenophilius wears around his neck as the mark of Grindelwald; the symbol is later discovered to be the mark of the Deathly Hallows. His attitude suggests that he wants to get back together with Hermione, and he is disgruntled to see her dancing with Ron. Krum then asks Harry (who is disguised as a Weasley) whether or not Ginny Weasley is single, showing that he has his eye on her, too. J.K. Rowling later stated that Krum eventually found love in his native Bulgaria.

Stanislav Ianevski portrayed Krum in the film adaptation of Goblet of Fire. He made a brief appearance in Deathly Hallows, but his scenes were cut from the film.

Augusta Longbottom
Augusta Longbottom is Neville's paternal grandmother, introduced in Philosopher's Stone before Neville leaves for Hogwarts. She raised him from a young age after Neville's parents were tortured and permanently incapacitated (using the Cruciatus Curse) by a group of Death Eaters led by Bellatrix Lestrange. Early on, it is established that Neville is terrified of his grandmother, who is a very strict disciplinarian, a perfectionist, a staunch opponent of Voldemort and a no-nonsense witch, especially towards Neville, sometimes complaining he is not as gifted a wizard as his father.

In Order of the Phoenix, Neville discloses that his grandmother fully supports Harry and Dumbledore's proclamations that Voldemort had returned, even going so far as to cancel her subscription to the Daily Prophet, because they keep toeing the Ministry of Magic line that Harry was lying. Later, Harry and his friends are visiting Arthur Weasley in St Mungo's Hospital for Magical Maladies and Injuries and meet Augusta and Neville who are visiting Frank and Alice (Neville's parents); Augusta explains to Harry's friends how Neville's parents got into that state. She reprimands Neville for failing to have already told his friends what happened to his parents, saying he should be "proud" to be their son for their bravery.

In Half-Blood Prince, Augusta wants Neville to continue studying Transfiguration instead of Charms, which she considers a soft option. It is revealed by Minerva McGonagall that Augusta thinks like this because she failed her Charms O.W.L. McGonagall also writes a letter to Augusta telling her it's time that she "learned to be proud of the grandson she's got, rather than the one she thinks she ought to have".

Deathly Hallows is a definite turning point for the relationship between Augusta and her grandson. Towards the climax of the book, it is revealed that the Death Eaters targeted Augusta when Neville began acting as leader of the reformed Dumbledore's Army. The Ministry official John Dawlish is sent to arrest her; according to Neville, he was expecting an old woman living alone to be an easy target. However, the implications are that Augusta is actually an extremely capable witch, easily overpowering Dawlish and evading capture by the Death Eaters. She sends Neville an encouraging letter, which he keeps by his heart. Augusta arrives at the Battle of Hogwarts to assist her grandson. Bolstered by Neville's leadership of the D.A. during his seventh year at Hogwarts, Augusta ultimately becomes extremely proud of him.

In the 2006 skit for the Children's Party at the Palace, it is revealed Augusta keeps a mousetrap in her bag. Neville explains that his grandfather placed a Fanged Gerbil in Augusta's bag in 1947, believing it would be funny. Augusta didn't agree with this, particularly after the gerbil bit her, and placed a mousetrap in her bag to prevent a repeat of this happening again.

Augusta is portrayed by Leila Hoffman in the first film, appearing only in the background escorting Neville to the Hogwarts Express.

Xenophilius Lovegood
Xenophilius Lovegood is Pandora Lovegood's husband, Luna Lovegood's father, and the editor of The Quibbler, a magazine that often publishes stories about wild conspiracy theories or research on seemingly non-existent creatures. In Greek, his name means "one who likes that which is strange" (xeno meaning "strange" and philo meaning "liking" or "fondness").

He is introduced in Deathly Hallows as a guest at the wedding of Fleur Delacour and Bill Weasley, and is said to be a friend. He is described as eccentric looking, being slightly cross-eyed, with shoulder-length white hair the texture of candyfloss and wearing garishly coloured robes. Xenophilius wears the symbol of the Deathly Hallows around his neck as a way of showing his willingness to help other believers in the Hallows in their quest to obtain them.

Later in the story, he explains to Harry, Ron, and Hermione the significance of the Deathly Hallows. Although initially one of the staunchest supporters of the anti-Voldemort, pro-Harry Potter movement through his magazine, Xenophilius later betrays the trio's location to the Death Eater-controlled Ministry of Magic in a bid to ensure the safe return of his kidnapped daughter. After an ensuing battle with Xenophilius and the Death Eaters, the trio escape and the Death Eaters arrest Xenophilius, which saves his reputation, as he is mentioned on the clandestine "Potterwatch" radio broadcast as a persecuted anti-Voldemort dissident, and the issue of The Quibbler in which he attacks Harry is buried under the ruins of his home and never distributed. Harry, Ron, and Hermione never reveal his attempted betrayal, which was motivated solely by fear for Luna's life.

Welsh actor and singer Rhys Ifans portrays Xenophilius in the film adaptation of Harry Potter and the Deathly Hallows – Part 1.

Teddy Lupin
Edward Remus "Teddy" Lupin is the orphaned only son of Remus Lupin and Nymphadora Tonks and godson of Harry Potter. He is named after Tonks' late father, Ted Tonks, and his own father, Remus. Teddy is a Metamorphmagus like his mother Nymphadora, and is not affected by his father's lycanthropy. He is mentioned in the final chapter of Harry Potter and the Deathly Hallows by Harry, who says that Teddy "comes round to dinner about four times a week".

Narcissa Malfoy
Narcissa Malfoy, born Narcissa Black to Cygnus Black III and Druella Rosier, is the youngest of three sisters, her older sisters being Bellatrix Lestrange and Andromeda Tonks. She is a cousin of Sirius and Regulus Black and an aunt to Nymphadora Tonks, Andromeda's daughter. Narcissa attended Hogwarts, where she was in Slytherin. She later married Lucius Malfoy, with whom she has one son, Draco, of whom she is extremely protective. Narcissa is first described as a tall, slim blonde who would have been attractive if not for "a look that suggested there was a nasty smell under her nose". Although Narcissa certainly seems to share the Blacks' and her husband's views on blood purity on the outside, her actions indicate she is far more concerned about the welfare of her family than helping Voldemort.

Although Narcissa makes her first, very brief appearance in Goblet of Fire, where she attends the Quidditch World Cup with her husband and son, her role in the series first becomes important in Harry Potter and the Half-Blood Prince. At the beginning of the book, Narcissa and Bellatrix arrive suddenly at Snape's home. Narcissa is distraught, almost hysterical, with her husband imprisoned in Azkaban and her son forced to accept a difficult and dangerous assignment by Voldemort. She begs Snape to help Draco and asks him to make an Unbreakable Vow, to which he agrees. Narcissa also appears later in the novel, shopping with Draco for his new robes at Madam Malkin's. She and Draco bump into Harry, Ron and Hermione. Harry taunts Narcissa for her husband being sent to Azkaban, and in turn, she mocks his dead godfather, Sirius Black. Narcissa also says that "Harry will be reunited with dear Sirius before I am reunited with Lucius", showing that she believes Harry is to die soon. Draco defuses the situation by leaving with his mother.

In Deathly Hallows, Narcissa's home is being used (against her will) as the Headquarters for Voldemort and his Death Eaters and for confining several prisoners, including eventually, Harry, Ron, and Hermione. When this group escapes with the help of Dobby, Voldemort places Narcissa and her family under house arrest. In the climax of the book, the Malfoys are brought with the other Death Eaters to Hogwarts, when Voldemort invades the castle. When Voldemort casts a Killing Curse on Harry, Narcissa is ordered to verify his death. When she feels Harry's heart beating, she quietly asks him whether Draco is still alive at Hogwarts, a fact that Harry confirms. Knowing that she will not be free to search for her son unless she can return with the Death Eaters as part of a "conquering army", Narcissa lies to Voldemort and declares Harry to be dead. She is later seen at the end of the book, with her husband and son, unsure what to do and how to behave amidst the celebration of Voldemort's death. However, thanks to her lie to Voldemort, the Malfoys manage to avoid imprisonment in Azkaban.

In the film series, Narcissa shows very little to no animosity towards Harry personally, only duelling him after he attacks Draco during the Battle of Malfoy Manor. Narcissa's question to Harry and subsequent lie to Voldemort are preserved in the film. Narcissa's reaction to the final battle is changed dramatically: she utterly ignores it, literally turning her back on the situation and taking Draco with her, with Lucius following after a moment. Narcissa is portrayed by Helen McCrory in the film series. McCrory was initially cast as Bellatrix Lestrange, but withdrew due to pregnancy; the role of Bellatrix went to Helena Bonham Carter.

Olympe Maxime
Madame Olympe Maxime is the headmistress of Beauxbatons, the French wizarding school. The character is introduced in Goblet of Fire when her school is invited to the Triwizard Tournament, with Fleur Delacour being elected as Beauxbatons' champion. When Harry is chosen as the fourth champion and second Hogwarts champion, she is angered and is about to leave the tournament, but she eventually agrees to stay. In Goblet of Fire, she is described as being elegant and wearing black satin robes, and having olive skin and handsome features, but being extremely tall. It is revealed that Madame Maxime's huge size is due to her half-giant background. She fiercely denies this, although she is around the same height as fellow half-giant Rubeus Hagrid. Upon first sight, Hagrid immediately takes a fancy to Madame Maxime, which he shows by attempting to groom himself properly and wearing his hairy brown suit when she is around.

In Order of the Phoenix, Hagrid tells Harry, Ron, and Hermione that he and Madame Maxime visited the giants during that summer to get them on to the Order of the Phoenix's side. Unfortunately, they failed in their mission, because Voldemort also sent a group of Death Eaters to address the giants. When giants attack Hagrid, Madame Maxime defended him by using a conjunctivitis curse. Hagrid describes her spell work as "brilliant". She separates from Hagrid during the return journey, however, because he would not abandon his giant half-brother Grawp, who proves to be a highly taxing travelling companion. She returns to Beauxbatons alone. In Half-Blood Prince, Madame Maxime is among those paying respects at Dumbledore's funeral. Her last appearance is in Deathly Hallows, where she attends the wedding of Bill Weasley and Fleur Delacour.

Frances de la Tour appeared as Madame Maxime in Goblet of Fire, and reprised the role in Deathly Hallows.

Cormac McLaggen
Cormac McLaggen is a Gryffindor student one year above Harry. He is introduced during the train journey to Hogwarts in Half-Blood Prince as a member of Horace Slughorn's Slug Club due to his uncle's close ties with the Ministry of Magic. Cormac is depicted as unsympathetic, and his Gryffindor bravery is both a strength and a flaw: he is foolhardy and proud, bordering on arrogant.

Cormac goes up against Ron in trying out for the position of Keeper on the Quidditch team when Harry becomes captain, but Hermione secretly jinxes him with the Confundus Charm, causing him to miss his last save and thus helping Ron retain his spot. He starts Gryffindor's match against Hufflepuff after Ron is unable to play due to poisoning, but his debut is disastrous as he orders the team about instead of focusing on his own position, knocks Harry unconscious with a Bludger, and contributes to Gryffindor's lopsided 320–60 loss, thus earning him universal dislike among his housemates. He briefly becomes a pawn in the escalating tensions between Ron and Hermione, when Hermione invites him to Slughorn's Christmas party as her date, in retaliation for Ron's relationship with Lavender Brown. The plan backfires when she becomes exasperated with McLaggen's arrogant behaviour, and she leaves him stranded under the mistletoe and avoids him for the remainder of the party.

In Harry Potter and the Deathly Hallows – Part 1, Cormac is seen on the Hogwarts Express, and in Part 2 he is seen participating in, and surviving, the Battle of Hogwarts.

Freddie Stroma played McLaggen in Harry Potter and the Half-Blood Prince, Harry Potter and the Deathly Hallows – Part 1 and Part 2.

Auntie Muriel
Muriel is a great-aunt of the Weasley children (on Molly's side). According to Ron, she is rude to just about everyone she meets. Harry first meets her in Harry Potter and the Deathly Hallows during Bill and Fleur's wedding. She is described as having bloodshot eyes and a large, feathery pink hat, making her look like a "badly tempered flamingo". She lends her beautiful goblin-made tiara to Fleur for the wedding. During the wedding, she starts an argument with Elphias Doge about Dumbledore's past and Rita Skeeter's The Life and Lies of Albus Dumbledore. In spite of her dislike for the late Dumbledore, Muriel offers support to the Order of the Phoenix, providing her house in The Deathly Hallows for Harry when the Order removes him from the safety of the Dursleys'. Later in the book, most of the Weasleys and several others hide in her house because they are targeted as blood traitors or Mudbloods.

Matyelok Gibbs appears as Muriel in Harry Potter and the Deathly Hallows – Part 1, but during the film she is never identified.

Moaning Myrtle
Moaning Myrtle (born Myrtle Warren) is a ghost who haunts the second-floor girls' lavatory at Hogwarts. True to her nickname, she has a tendency to moan, sob, whine, wail and complain, especially upon the mention of death. Her constant moping and wailing causes plumbing problems in the lavatory she haunts.

In Chamber of Secrets, it is established that the character is the ghost of a Muggle-born witch who died while a student at Hogwarts, fifty years before the events in the book. Myrtle was hiding in the second-floor girls' lavatory to elude Olive Hornby, a classmate who perpetually tormented her about her glasses, when the Chamber of Secrets was opened and the basilisk emerged and killed her. Tom Riddle used her death to create his first Horcrux: his diary. After death, Myrtle haunted Olive everywhere she went, until Olive complained to the Ministry of Magic, which ordered Myrtle to return to Hogwarts. Myrtle has since sulkily haunted the same lavatory where she died, but despite her miserable disposition, she is often flirtatious with Harry.

Myrtle assists Harry with his second task in the Triwizard Tournament in Harry Potter and the Goblet of Fire. She tells Harry how to solve the puzzle of the golden egg that he retrieved in the first task, by opening it underwater. She is more upbeat and mischievous, and enjoys having Harry briefly to herself to boss around. He later meets her in the lake where she directs him to the merpeople's village. In Harry Potter and the Half-Blood Prince, she comforts Malfoy, who is worried about the task Voldemort has assigned him. After Harry near-fatally injures Malfoy with a Sectumsempra spell, Myrtle quickly spreads the news by screaming, "Murder! Murder in the bathroom!"

Rowling revealed on her website that Myrtle was in Ravenclaw House and that her full name was Myrtle Elizabeth Warren. She added that the inspiration for the character was "the frequent presence of a crying girl in communal bathrooms, especially at the parties and discos of my youth."

Shirley Henderson plays Myrtle in the film versions of Chamber of Secrets and Goblet of Fire. The character was omitted from Half-Blood Prince.

Garrick Ollivander
Garrick Ollivander is the proprietor of Ollivanders, a prestigious shop which sells magical wands in Diagon Alley. Although Ollivander is generally presented as a genial elderly man, Harry is unnerved in his first two meetings with him in the series because the wandmaker appears to admire what Voldemort could do with his original wand and, later, the Elder Wand. Despite his wands' popularity, he can easily remember the materials and attributes of every wand he has ever sold, as well as its owner. In the Philosopher's Stone, Ollivander assists 11-year-old Harry in selecting his first wand. Finding Harry a particularly difficult customer to match, Ollivander finally selects an eleven-inch-long wand made of holly containing a phoenix feather (later revealed to have come from Dumbledore's phoenix, Fawkes), which is perfectly suited to Harry. Ollivander is intrigued that this particular wand would suit Harry, and reveals that Fawkes contributed only one other feather, to the wand being used by Voldemort.

Ollivander appears in the Goblet of Fire during the preliminary ceremonies of the Triwizard Tournament, where he acts as an expert judge for the 'Weighing of the Wands'. In the Half-Blood Prince, his shop has closed and is boarded up, and Ollivander himself is missing. The opening scene of the Half-Blood Prince film shows Mr Ollivander hooded and forcibly seized from his shop by three Death Eaters. In the Deathly Hallows, Ollivander has been captured by Voldemort and imprisoned at Malfoy Manor with Luna, with whom he develops an affectionate relationship as the two strive to keep each other's spirits up. He is among those rescued from the manor by Dobby, after which, at Shell Cottage, he provides Harry and his friends with some useful information about the Elder Wand. He later goes into hiding at the home of Auntie Muriel and sends Luna a new wand as a gift.

British actor John Hurt appeared as Ollivander in the film adaptation of Harry Potter and the Philosopher's Stone and reprised his role in Harry Potter and the Deathly Hallows – Part 1 and Part 2.

His first name was revealed in Pottermore. It was also revealed that he is married and has a son and a daughter (the latter deceased). Some of the names of his wandmaker ancestors were also revealed: Geraint Ollivander (ancestor), Gerbold Octavius Ollivander (paternal grandfather), Gervaise Ollivander (father).

Pansy Parkinson
Pansy Parkinson is a Slytherin student who is described as pug-faced and frequently seen with an unnamed gang of Slytherin girls, acting as their leader, or at least spokeswoman. Rowling said the character was based on real-life girls who teased her during her school days. She is first mentioned in the Sorting in Philosopher's Stone, and makes her first appearance in Madam Hooch's flying class, during which she teases Parvati Patil for defending Neville Longbottom after Draco steals Longbottom's Remembrall. In Prisoner of Azkaban, she cries and follows Malfoy to the hospital wing after he is attacked by Buckbeak, and continues to fawn over him despite his deliberate exaggeration of the extent of his injury. They attended the Yule Ball together in Goblet of Fire.

Throughout the series, Pansy regularly mocks Harry and his companions. She gives false information on Harry, Hermione, and Hagrid to Rita Skeeter, and openly voices criticisms of Hagrid to Umbridge in terms of her displeasure about his Care of Magical Creatures class and her difficulty in understanding his voice. She and other Slytherins also taunt the Gryffindor Quidditch players from the stands during a morning practice, notably teasing Angelina Johnson about her braided hair. During a Gryffindor-Slytherin match, which is also Ron's debut as the new Gryffindor Keeper, she conducts the Slytherin students as they sing a demeaning song entitled "Weasley is our King".

Pansy has a slightly increased role in Harry Potter and the Order of the Phoenix. She is made a Slytherin prefect along with Malfoy, and later joins Dolores Umbridge's Inquisitorial Squad. When Dumbledore's Army flees the Room of Requirement following Dobby's revelation of an informant, Pansy searches the girls' bathrooms for escaped members and seizes Hermione's list of names as evidence. However, the Inquisitorial Squad members are jinxed in the midst of a student rebellion following Fred and George Weasley's departure from Hogwarts. Pansy is thereafter admitted to the hospital wing and misses a day's worth of lessons after sprouting a pair of antlers. Near the conclusion of Deathly Hallows, when Voldemort demands Harry's surrender to prevent the attack on Hogwarts, she advocates handing him to the Death Eaters, only for the other houses to collectively respond by standing up and pointing their wands at her. She eventually evacuates with the other Slytherins after having been dismissed by McGonagall.

Pansy was portrayed by Katherine Nicholson in the Philosopher's Stone and in the Chamber of Secrets, Genevieve Gaunt in Prisoner of Azkaban, Charlotte Ritchie in the Goblet of Fire, Lauren Shotton in Order of Phoenix, and by Scarlett Byrne in Half-Blood Prince, Deathly Hallows – Part 1 and Part 2.

Antioch, Cadmus, and Ignotus Peverell
The Peverell family is first mentioned in Half-Blood Prince as ancestors of Marvolo Gaunt, the maternal grandfather of Voldemort. In the final book of the series, they are revealed to be the original owners of the Deathly Hallows, which, according to The Tales of Beedle the Bard, they received from Death, although Dumbledore believed it is more likely that they created them themselves. The Peverell lineage continues through its living descendants, including Harry and his children.

After Hermione saw the symbol of the Deathly Hallows on Ignotus Peverell's grave in Godric's Hollow, Harry recalled Marvolo Gaunt boasting that his ring held the Peverell coat of arms on it, thus realising that the three brothers were the Peverells. Harry deduces that he is descended from Ignotus, as the cloak is passed down through his family. Furthermore, Rowling has confirmed that Harry and Voldemort are indeed distant relatives because of their relation to the Peverells, as the majority of wizard families share common ancestry.

Antioch Peverell was the eldest of the three Peverell brothers, and owner of the Elder Wand. He was killed in his sleep after bragging about the wand's invincibility, having won a duel with it. The murderer then stole the Elder Wand, thus initiating its bloody history.

Cadmus Peverell was the middle of the three Peverell brothers, and owner of the Resurrection Stone. Using the Stone, he resurrected the girl he had once hoped to marry, who had died an untimely death. Though she had returned to the mortal world, she did not truly belong there and suffered. Driven mad by this, he killed himself to join her. The Stone was later embedded in a ring that ended up belonging to Marvolo Gaunt.

Ignotus Peverell was the youngest of the three Peverell brothers, described in The Tales of Beedle the Bard as "the humblest and the wisest of the brothers". He was the owner of the Cloak of Invisibility, due to which, unlike his brothers, he avoided dying for many years, living a full and long life, and ultimately "greeting Death as a friend." Harry deduces that his invisibility cloak is the original cloak owned by Ignotus. Unlike other cloaks of invisibility, it has never shown any kind of fading or damage despite the cloak being passed down through many generations of the Peverell family and ultimately to Harry. Harry is therefore a descendant of Ignotus Peverell. Both by birthright and by blood relations, Harry Potter is the rightful owner of the three Deathly Hallows, yet he decides to keep the Cloak only, returning the Elder Wand to Dumbledore's tomb after using it only to repair his own holly wand, and leaving the Resurrection Stone lost in the Forbidden Forest. In the film Deathly Hallows Part – 2, Harry destroys the Elder Wand, snapping it in half and throwing the pieces off a bridge.

Madam Rosmerta
Madam Rosmerta is the landlady of The Three Broomsticks pub. She is described in the books as "a curvy sort of woman" with curly hair; several students—including Ron—have a crush on her. In Prisoner of Azkaban, Madam Rosmerta is angered when Dementors are in Hogsmeade as their presence is scaring away many of her customers. Apart from hosting an informal meeting between McGonagall, Cornelius Fudge, Filius Flitwick, and Hagrid, she does not play a major role in the early part of the Harry Potter series.

In Half-Blood Prince it emerges that in order to fulfil his mission to assassinate Dumbledore, Draco has managed to place Rosmerta under the Imperius Curse. He uses her to pass on a cursed necklace to Hogwarts student Katie Bell, who accidentally touches the necklace and is herself subjected to the very harmful curse intended for the Headmaster. Draco also commands her to send a bottle of poisoned mead to Horace Slughorn intending it to be a Christmas present for Dumbledore, after overhearing Hermione mentioning that the school security would not recognise something put in a mislabelled bottle, and knowing that a package from Rosmerta would not be checked. Malfoy communicates with Rosmerta through enchanted fake Galleons. After Harry and Dumbledore's adventure in the cave to retrieve a locket they believe to be one of Voldemort's Horcruxes, they apparate to Hogsmeade, where Madam Rosmerta alerts them to the presence of the Dark Mark above the school and gives them brooms on which they can travel rapidly back to Hogwarts, where Draco's plan can be brought to completion. Rosmerta is among those paying respects at Dumbledore's funeral.

She is named after the Gaulish goddess Rosmerta, whose attributes include abundance and fertility.

Julie Christie appeared as Madam Rosmerta in the film adaptation of Harry Potter and the Prisoner of Azkaban.

Stan Shunpike
Stan Shunpike is the young, pimply conductor of the Knight Bus. He speaks with a Cockney accent and talks to Harry as he travels to London in the first part of Prisoner of Azkaban. He also appears briefly in Harry Potter and the Goblet of Fire at the Quidditch World Cup, boasting to a group of Veela, the Bulgarian team's official mascot, of his ambitious plans to become the next Minister of Magic. In Order of the Phoenix, he conducts the Knight Bus when Harry, Ron, Hermione, Fred, George, Ginny, Lupin, and Tonks take it to return to Hogwarts after the Christmas holidays. Stan mentions that he does not believe the media rumours about Harry being insane, though Harry interprets Stan's actions as not caring how insane someone is as long as he/she is famous enough to get into the papers.

In Harry Potter and the Half-Blood Prince, Stan is arrested on suspicion of Death Eater activity. Harry and Dumbledore, however, believe that he is almost certainly not guilty. Even so, Stan is kept in Azkaban in order for the Ministry of Magic to give the pretence that progress is being made in the capturing of Death Eaters. When the new Minister for Magic asks Harry to be a sort of mascot for the Ministry, Harry refuses on the grounds of the Ministry's actions at the time – namely holding Stan under arrest. In Deathly Hallows, a "strangely blank" looking Stan is among the Death Eaters who pursue Harry during his escape from Privet Drive. Harry gives himself away to his attackers by attempting to only disarm Stan, as Harry believes him to be under the Imperius Curse, and is later reprimanded by Remus Lupin. Later on, when Harry, Ron and Hermione are captured in the forest by Fenrir Greyback, Ron attempts to pose as Stan only to be immediately disbelieved and told Stan has "put a bit of work their way" referring to turning in missing or wanted Muggle-borns.

Stan was portrayed by Lee Ingleby in the film adaptation of Prisoner of Azkaban.

Rita Skeeter
Rita Skeeter is a reporter for the Daily Prophet and a correspondent for the Witch Weekly, who specialises in tabloid journalism, for which she is armed with such magical devices as the Quick-Quotes Quill. Rita is an unregistered Animagus, capable of transforming into a beetle to spy on unsuspecting victims for her stories, which she is revealed to have done multiple times in Harry Potter and the Goblet of Fire. As a reporter who fabricates information to write an appealing story, she is a nuisance to Harry and his friends throughout Goblet of Fire, and a brief but reluctant ally in Order of the Phoenix. She is described as having curly blonde hair, jewelled spectacles, thick fingers with two-inch long nails painted crimson, a crocodile-skin handbag, and a heavy jawed face.

Harry first encounters Rita when she interviews the Triwizard Tournament contestants for an article in the Daily Prophet, which turns out to be a highly falsified story on Harry himself. During the situations where Rita overhears information, the book subtly refers to her presence: Viktor Krum mentions that Hermione has a water beetle in her hair, and during the Yule Ball, she overhears Hagrid telling Madame Maxime that he is half-giant, Harry having noticed a beetle on a nearby statue. During a Divinations class, Harry falls asleep and hears an "insect clicking." Rita prints an article that portrays Hagrid as dangerous, prompting letters from parents frightened by the idea of having a "ferocious" giant teach their children. When Rita encounters Harry, Ron, and Hermione in Hogsmeade, Hermione insults her. Rita, in revenge, then writes a nasty story about Hermione based on false rumours provided by Pansy Parkinson, making her out to be a plain but skilled witch who uses love potions to "satisfy her taste for celebrity wizards," including Harry and Krum. Rita's last defaming article states that Harry is "disturbed and dangerous," and uses comments from Draco and his Slytherin cronies as its basis. Ultimately, Hermione discovers the means by which Rita Skeeter spies on others and forces her to "keep her quill to herself for a full year", threatening to report her to the authorities as an illegal Animagus. Her last article discredits Harry and serves as the basis for Cornelius Fudge's refusal to believe Harry's story about Voldemort's return. It is also the start of the Ministry's smear campaign against Harry and Dumbledore.

In Harry Potter and the Order of the Phoenix Hermione blackmails Rita by threatening to reveal that she is an Animagus and forces her to interview Harry about Voldemort's return. She then must submit her story to The Quibbler. Rita later makes a brief appearance in Half-Blood Prince, where Harry is infuriated to notice her clutching a notebook at Dumbledore's funeral. Although Rita does not make an appearance in Deathly Hallows, she is mentioned on numerous occasions throughout the novel, generally in a negative light in relation to her unauthorised biography of Dumbledore entitled The Life and Lies of Albus Dumbledore. The book depicts the former headmaster in an extremely negative light but is mostly based on truth, much to Harry's horror. It is implied that she gained some of her information in unethical or illegal ways. When asked on a web chat if Rita was still reporting, Rowling answered "Naturally, what could stop Rita? I imagine she immediately dashed off a biography of Harry after he defeated Voldemort. One quarter truth to three-quarters rubbish," and suggested she would also write "Snape: Scoundrel or Saint?"

It has been speculated that the fraught relationship between Rowling and the press was the inspiration for the author to develop the character. However, Rowling noted in 2000 that the character actually predates her rise to fame. Rita was intended to be in Philosopher's Stone, as Rowling revealed in an interview: "you know when Harry walks into the Leaky Cauldron for the first time and everyone says, "Mr. Potter you're back!", I wanted to put a journalist in there. She wasn't called Rita then but she was a woman. And then I thought, as I looked at the plot overall, I thought, that's not really where she fits best, she fits best in Four when Harry's supposed to come to terms with his fame".

Miranda Richardson appeared as Rita in the film adaptation of Goblet of Fire as well as in Deathly Hallows.

Hepzibah Smith
Hepzibah Smith is introduced within Dumbledore's Pensieve, as part of a series of memories shown to Harry by his headmaster probing into Voldemort's past. She is described as having been an extremely wealthy, well-born old witch who enjoyed collecting antiques and collectibles. In the memory, Hepzibah wears long robes and gowns of pink, and when sitting upon her throne-like chair, she is described as giving the impression of a large "melting iced cake". She wears a large, elaborate, ginger wig upon her head and dabs her red cheeks with rouge.

Tom Riddle, fresh out of Hogwarts and working for Borgin and Burkes, visits Hepzibah to make an offer for some goblin-made armour which she owns. He presents her with flowers and charms and flatters her. Enamoured with Riddle, Hepzibah shows him her most prized possessions – a cup, owned by her ancestor Helga Hufflepuff, and a locket which once belonged to Salazar Slytherin, that she had purchased from Borgin and Burkes. Two days after the events of the memory occurred, Hepzibah died (having been poisoned by her elderly house-elf, who was under the Imperious curse), and Hufflepuff's cup and Slytherin's locket were never found. She may be related to Zacharias Smith, a student in Harry's year in Hufflepuff House.

Andromeda Tonks
Andromeda Tonks is the mother of Nymphadora Tonks. Born Andromeda Black, she is a pure-blood witch, daughter of Cygnus Black and Druella Rosier and sister of Bellatrix Lestrange and Narcissa Malfoy. The middle sister, she was burned off the family tapestry in Number 12, Grimmauld Place by her aunt Walburga and estranged from the family because she married Ted Tonks, a Muggle-born wizard. She was Sirius Black's favourite cousin. Andromeda is responsible for giving her daughter the name "Nymphadora", a name like those typical of her family. She has a talent for household spells and cleanliness, lacked by her husband and daughter.

She is not introduced until the beginning of Harry Potter and the Deathly Hallows. She strongly resembles her sister Bellatrix, so much so that Harry thinks she is Bellatrix upon first meeting her, but Andromeda is kind looking and has soft brown rather than black hair. She and Ted are later tortured for information on Harry's whereabouts. For someone who is not a member of the Order of the Phoenix, the war with Voldemort and his followers exacts a very heavy toll on Andromeda: her husband, her daughter, her son-in-law and her sister are all killed. Rowling stated in an interview that after the war, Andromeda raises Teddy Lupin, her grandson. She is never seen in the films.

Ted Tonks
Edward "Ted" Tonks is a Muggle-born wizard who is described as a "fair-haired, big-bellied man". He marries Andromeda Black. Their marriage led to his wife's disownment by the rest of her strict pure-blood family. Ted and Andromeda are the parents of Nymphadora Tonks. Ted plays an active role in Harry Potter and the Deathly Hallows. Near the beginning of the novel, his home is a hideout for Harry and Hagrid, as the two are on the run from Voldemort. His home holds the Portkey that helps Harry escape to The Burrow. Later due to Ted's refusal to register as a Muggle-born, he is one of the Muggle-born wizards to flee the Ministry's new oppressive regime after the Death Eaters take over. During his flight, he meets the goblins Griphook and Gornuk, as well as Dean Thomas and Dirk Cresswell. Soon after, Ted is murdered by Snatchers who also kill Gornuk and Cresswell. When Nymphadora gives birth to her and Lupin's son, they name him Teddy in honour of her father.

Oliver Wood
Oliver Wood is Captain and keeper of the Gryffindor Quidditch team in the first three novels and was first introduced in Harry Potter and the Philosopher's Stone. He is simply described as being big and burly. Wood is a talented and keen player and a born leader as captain, but also tends to act as a taskmaster due to his obsession with the game; he never cancels practices, poor weather conditions notwithstanding, and holds training sessions in early morning hours. Although Oliver is in general a nice person, he lacks tact. Oliver appears briefly in Goblet of Fire, when he excitedly introduces Harry to his parents at the Quidditch World Cup and announces that he joined the Puddlemere United reserve team. He is one of many Hogwarts students, past and present, who take part in the Battle of Hogwarts in Deathly Hallows, and is among the survivors of the first clash; Harry sees him assisting Neville Longbottom in carrying the body of Colin Creevey. He is four years above Harry in Gryffindor.

Oliver Wood was portrayed by Sean Biggerstaff in the first two films and once again in the eighth film.

The Muggle Prime Minister 
The Prime Minister of the United Kingdom, referred to as the Muggle Prime Minister by wizards, receives a visit from Cornelius Fudge and Rufus Scrimgeour in the opening chapter of Harry Potter and the Half-Blood Prince. Using a series of flashbacks, Rowling describes how the Prime Minister is aware of the existence of the wizarding world, through several meetings with Fudge that include his first night as Prime Minister and other occasions during which Fudge informed him of Sirius Black's escape from Azkaban (3rd book), of the incident in the Quidditch World Cup, of importation of dragons and a sphinx for the Triwizard Tournament (both 4th book) and finally of the mass break-out from Azkaban (5th book). Rowling intended to include the Prime Minister scene in earlier books, but she thought that it could not properly fit until the sixth book.

In the first chapter of Harry Potter and the Half-Blood Prince, the Prime Minister recalls his day, during which one of his political opponents had been criticising him and his government for several catastrophes that have recently happened in Britain. Readers discover a little later during the discussion with Fudge, that these catastrophes are, in fact, the doings of Voldemort and his followers. He also discovers that he is protected by an Auror who now works in his office, Kingsley Shacklebolt.

The Weird Sisters
The Weird Sisters are a wizarding rock band. Their instruments include guitars, bass, lute, cello, bagpipes and drums. They are booked by Dumbledore to play at Hogwarts during the Yule Ball. In Harry Potter and the Goblet of Fire they are described as "all extremely hairy and dressed in black robes that had been artfully ripped and torn." A full music video of the band playing at the Yule Ball is included as an extended scene on the Goblet of Fire film 2-disc DVD. In 2005, Warner Bros., the international distributor of Goblet of Fire was sued for trademark violations by members of a Canadian folk-rock band named The Wyrd Sisters. The term Weird Sisters is also used in William Shakespeare's play Macbeth to describe the three witches, and more closely contemporaneous with the Harry Potter novels, in Terry Pratchett's Discworld Cycle.

The members of the band according to Wizards of the Coast Famous Wizard cards are:
Heathcote Barbary – rhythm guitar
Gideon Crumb – bagpipes
Kirley Duke – lead guitar
Merton Graves – cello
Orsino Thruston – drums
Donaghan Tremlett – bass
Myron Wagtail – lead singer
Herman Wintringham – lute

They appear in the film version of Harry Potter and the Goblet of Fire played by the following real-life musicians:
Jarvis Cocker (of Pulp) as Myron Wagtail – vocals
Jonny Greenwood (of Radiohead) as Kirley Duke – lead guitar
Jason Buckle (of All Seeing I) as Heathcote Barbary – rhythm guitar
Steve Mackey (of Pulp) as Donaghan Tremlett – bass
Steven Claydon (of Add N to (X)) as Gideon Crumb – keyboards and bagpipes
Phil Selway (of Radiohead) as Orsino Thruston – drums

They performed three songs (all composed by Cocker), entitled "Do the Hippogriff", "This Is the Night" and "Magic Works" during the Yule Ball.

Children of the Potter family

James Sirius Potter
James Sirius Potter is the first-born child of Harry and Ginny Potter, born two years before his brother Albus Severus Potter. He was named after his paternal  grandfather James Potter and his father's godfather Sirius Black, and he is described as being similar in character to both of his namesakes as well as his uncles, Fred and George Weasley, with a penchant for practical jokes and general misbehaviour. James is portrayed by Will Dunn in Deathly Hallows – Part 2.
James Sirius Potter was born in 2004. He started in Hogwarts in September 2015, and was sorted into Gryffindor House.

Albus Severus Potter
Albus Severus Potter is Harry and Ginny's second-born child. Albus is said to look much like Harry and to be the only one of his siblings to have inherited Lily Potter's green eyes.  He is named after Albus Dumbledore and Severus Snape, and would be eleven at the time of the epilogue. Albus is portrayed by Arthur Bowen in Harry Potter and the Deathly Hallows – Part 2.

Albus is one of the main characters in the two-part stage play Harry Potter and the Cursed Child. He has been played in the West End production by Sam Clemmett, Theo Ancient, Joe Idris-Roberts, and Dominic Short. Albus was born in 2006. He is the best friend of Scorpius Hyperion Malfoy, and he was sorted into Slytherin House together with Scorpius.

Lily Luna Potter
Lily Luna Potter is the daughter of Harry and Ginny, the youngest of their three children. Her name honours two women important to her parents—her paternal grandmother Lily Potter, and her parents' friend Luna Lovegood. She is two years younger than her brother Albus Severus, making her around nine, and is close in age to her cousin Hugo. It is also stated that she has her mother's and possibly both of her own grandmothers' red hair and beauty. In the epilogue of Harry Potter and the Deathly Hallows, she accompanied her parents as they escorted James and Albus Potter to Platform 9¾ and the Hogwarts Express. In The Cursed Child, she started Hogwarts in September 2019, and was sorted into Gryffindor House.

Lily is portrayed by Daphne de Beistegui in Harry Potter and the Deathly Hallows – Part 2.

Children of the Weasleys

Rose Granger-Weasley
Rose Granger-Weasley is Hermione and Ron's daughter and eldest child. Rose is introduced in the Harry Potter and the Deathly Hallows epilogue in which she is leaving for her first year at Hogwarts, as is her cousin Albus Severus Potter. According to Ron she inherited her mother's brains and ambition. She is depicted as the romantic love interest of Scorpius Malfoy in Harry Potter and the Cursed Child. When she started Hogwarts in September 2017, the same time as her cousin Albus, she was sorted into Gryffindor House and was made Quidditch Chaser in her second year.

Rose is portrayed by Helena Barlow in Harry Potter and the Deathly Hallows – Part 2.  She also featured in Harry Potter and the Cursed Child; she has been played in the West End production by Cherrelle Skeete and Helen Aluko.

Hugo Granger-Weasley
Hugo Granger-Weasley is Hermione and Ron's son and youngest child. He is close in age to Harry and Ginny's daughter and youngest child, Lily Luna Potter, and had not yet started at Hogwarts by the epilogue of Deathly Hallows.

Hugo is portrayed by Ryan Turner in Deathly Hallows – Part 2.

Draco Malfoy's family

Astoria Greengrass
Astoria Greengrass is the late wife of Draco Malfoy. She is three years younger than Draco, and the younger sister of one of Draco's classmates from Slytherin. She appears in Harry Potter and the Cursed Child, but she dies when her son turns fourteen in the early chapters of the story.

According to the play, Astoria was originally a follower of the pure-blood beliefs, but after witnessing the carnage and harrowing effects of the second wizarding war between the Death Eaters and Harry Potter's allies, she abandoned these ancient pure blood supremacist views, and adopted a more tolerant, accepting attitude towards half-bloods and muggle-borns. Due to this, she and Draco (who underwent similar, but more traumatising changes) fell in love and got married, much to the disapproval of Draco's parents, as they expected him to marry an individual from one of the oldest pure-blood wizarding families who embodied the ancient beliefs. Despite their tense relations with the in-laws, the couple remained loving as ever.

Astoria is said to have inherited an ancient blood curse from an unknown ancestor, which will shorten her life span and make her unable to live till old age. Draco is initially willing to allow the Malfoy bloodline to become extinct with him, much to Lucius's disappointment, as he wants to preserve his wife's health to let her live longer, since childbirth will potentially make her weaker. Astoria persuades him to revise this decision, as she wants Draco to have a child to accompany him and for themselves, not for pure-blood beliefs. She gives birth to a boy named Scorpius Hyperion Malfoy, the couple's first and only child. Scorpius's birth leads Astoria's health to be further weakened and eventually causes her to die fourteen years later. Despite this, the couple consider the day of Scorpius's birth as the best day of their lives.

Like her husband, Astoria taught her son not to believe in the pure-blood beliefs, and instead shaped him to become friendly to the half-blood and muggle-born wizards. Her eventual death at the age of 37 leaves both father and son devastated.

She is played by Jade Gordon in Harry Potter and the Deathly Hallows – Part 2.

Scorpius Malfoy
Scorpius Hyperion Malfoy is the only child of Draco and Astoria Malfoy. He is the best friend of Harry Potter's second son Albus Severus Potter and has a crush on Rose Granger-Weasley, the daughter of Ron Weasley and Hermione Granger. He is a kind-hearted boy who likes sweets and does not discriminate against non-pure-blood wizards. He was born in 2006, the same year as Albus.

He appears as one of the main characters of Harry Potter and the Cursed Child.

References

External links
 The Harry Potter Lexicon's page on the Dursley family

 
Harry Potter
Harry Potter
Harry Potter lists